Ribera is a Spanish word that translates into "the basin of a river", and may refer to:

Locations
 Ribera, Agrigento, a comune in the province of Agrigento, Sicily, Italy
 Ribera, Costa Rica, a former port on Aranjuez River
 Ribera Alta, Álava, a municipality in the province of Álava, Basque Country, Spain
 Ribera Alta (comarca), a comarca in the province of Valencia, Spain
 Ribera Baixa, a comarca in the province of Valencia, Spain
 Ribera Baja, the Spanish name of the municipality of Ribera Baja/Erribera Beitia in the province of Álava, Basque Country, Spain
 La Ribera, a municipality in the Principality of Asturias, Spain
 Ribera del Duero, a wine-producing region and Denominación de Origen in the autonomous community of Castile and León, Spain
 Ribera d'Ebre, a comarca in Catalonia, Spain
Ribera del Fresno, a municipality in the province of Badajoz, Extremadura, Spain
Ribera d'Ondara, a municipality in the comarca of the Segarra, Catalonia, Spain
Ribera d'Urgellet, a municipality in the comarca of the Alt Urgell, Catalonia, Spain
Ribera, New Mexico, a small village in northern New Mexico, U.S.
Ribera of Navarre, the flat region around the Ebro at the south of Navarre, Spain

Surname
 Francisco Ribera (1537–1591), Spanish Jesuit theologian
 Juan de Ribera (1532–1611), Archbishop of Valencia
 Juan de Ribera (1588–1666), Bishop of Santa Cruz de la Sierra
 Jusepe de Ribera (1591–1652), Spanish painter in Italy
 Juan Antonio Ribera (1779–1860), Spanish neoclassic painter
 Teresa Ribera (born 1969), Spanish jurist, professor and politician
 Marta Ribera (born 1971), Spanish actress
 Alejandra Ribera (born 1973), Canadian singer-songwriter
 Juan José Ribera (born 1980), Chilean footballer
 María Ribera (born 1986), Spanish rugby player
 Carolina Ribera (born 1990), Bolivian dentist and lawyer
 Joshua Ribera (1995-2013), known as Depzman, British rapper

Other
 Palacio de la Ribera, a former palace in Valladolid, Castile and León, Spain

See also
Rivera (disambiguation)
Riviera (disambiguation)